Demetrescu is a Romanian surname. Notable people with the surname include:

George Demetrescu Mirea, Romanian portrait painter, muralist, and art teacher
Traian Demetrescu, Romanian poet, novelist, and literary critic
Demetru Dem. Demetrescu-Buzău, better known as Urmuz

See also
Dimitrescu
Dumitrescu

Romanian-language surnames
Patronymic surnames
Surnames from given names